Edson Gabriel Justino (born 17 September 1998), commonly known as Gabriel Justino, is a Brazilian footballer who currently plays as a forward for Esporte Clube Primavera.

Career statistics

Club

Notes

References

1998 births
Living people
Brazilian footballers
Brazilian expatriate footballers
Association football forwards
Liga Portugal 2 players
Clube Atlético Juventus players
Resende Futebol Clube players
Mirassol Futebol Clube players
Vitória S.C. B players
Brazilian expatriate sportspeople in Portugal
Expatriate footballers in Portugal
Footballers from São Paulo